Miguel Salinas Arteche (4 June 1926 – 22 July 2012), best known as Miguel Arteche, the name he adopted after legally reversing his maternal and paternal surnames in 1972, was a Chilean poet and novelist. He was born in Nueva Imperial, Cautín, 9th Region, on June 4, 1926, but spent most of his adult life in Santiago, Chile working as an academic. He was also awarded government positions, both in Chile and abroad.  His writings appeared first in the Anthology of the Generation of 1950, compiled by Enrique Lafourcade, a well-known Chilean writer.

Biography 
He studied Law in the Universidad de Chile, but shortly dropped to study Literature at the Universidad de Madrid, Spain from 1951 to 1944. His work ranges from poetry to novels and short stories.

In 1947 he published his first book, Invitación al olvido. After publishing a number of poetry books, he published Cantata del desterrado in 1951 before departing to Europe. The experience of living in Spain was fundamental to his writing, approaching him to his family roots and the intellectual world of Europe. After some years he returned to Chile, where he continued his literary career. In 1976 he published one of his most celebrated books, Destierros y tinieblas.

In 1956, Chilean president Eduardo Frei Montalva nominated him to the Chilean Embassy in Madrid, where he remained until 1970, later being added to the Chilean Embassy in Honduras, where he worked until 1971, staying for an additional period as a Visiting Professor. After returning to Chile, he opposed the military government of Augusto Pinochet, which led to the marginalization of his work, which would prevent him from publishing in Chile until the return of democracy.

In 1996 he was awarded the Premio Nacional de Literatura, the greatest literary award in Chile.

Literary generation of 1950

Miguel Arteche is one of the authors of the so-called Generación literaria de 1950. Writers in this category were born between 1920 and 1934. This classification was proposed by author Enrique Lafourcade in 1954. Prominent writers of this generation were Miguel Arteche, Enrique Lafourcade, Pablo Neruda, Vicente Huidobro, Humberto Díaz Casanueva, Rosamel del Valle, Jorge Edwards, Claudio Giaconi, et al. These writers were influenced by authors such as Walt Whitman, William Faulkner and Ernest Hemingway. Miguel Arteche also stated the Spanish Siglo de oro as one of his main influences. He taught his students the traditional art of metrical writing against the use of free verse.

Works
El agua (the water), from Destierros y Tinieblas (Exiles and Darkness), 1963, is one of his most renowned poems; he had it in display hand-carved in wood at the entrance of his studio. Translated by Walter Hilliger, one of his students from the 90s:

Poetry

La invitación al olvido, 1947
Oda fúnebre, 1948
Una nube, 1949
El sur dormido, 1950
Cantata del desterrado, 1951
Solitario, mira hacia la ausencia, 1953
Otro continente, 1957
Quince poemas, 1961
Destierros y tinieblas, 1963
De la ausencia a la noche, 1965
Resta poética, 1966
Para un tiempo tan breve, 1970
Antología de veinte años, 1972
Noches, 1976
Cantata del Pan y la Sangre, 1980, 1981, 1986
Variaciones alemanas, 1986
Variaciones sobre versos de Karol Wojtyla, 1987
Monólogo en la Torre, 1989
Siete canciones, 1989
Tercera antología, 1991
Fénix de madrugada, 1975–1992
Poemas para nietos, 1996
Para un tiempo tan breve, 1997
Jardín de relojes, 2002

Novel

La otra orilla, 1964
El Cristo hueco, 1969
La disparatada vida de Félix Palissa, 1975
El alfil negro, 1992 (unpublished)

Short Story

Mapas del otro mundo, 1977
Las naranjas del silencio, 1987

Autobiography

Los ángeles de la provincia, 1975

Essay

Notas para la vieja y la nueva poesía chilena, 1958
La extrañeza de ser americano, 1962
Discurso de incorporación a la Academia Chilena de la Lengua, 1965
El extraño caso de Gabriela Mistral, 1968
Tres visiones de Carlos Droguett. 1971
Alfonso Calderón o cuarenta años después, 1978
Llaves para la poesía, 1984
Algunos de mis fantasmas, 1985
Algo acerca de la experiencia poética, 1988
La crítica poética y el crítico único, 1988
Exposición sobre un taller de poesía, 1988
La fuente dividida de Gabriela Mistral, 1989
El nombre perdido y buscado en América, 1989
Cómo leer un poema, 1989
Gabriela Mistral: seis o siete materias alucinadas, 1989
Escribir como niño para niños, 1990
De modo inseguro y problemático, 1990
Los coléricos hijos de Damaso Alonso, 1990
Algunos aprendices de brujo, 1989
Palabras en Alberti, 1991.

References

External links
Retablo de Literatura Chilena: Miguel Arteche
Memoria Chilena: Miguel Arteche

1926 births
2012 deaths
Chilean male poets
National Prize for Literature (Chile) winners
20th-century Chilean poets
20th-century Chilean male writers
21st-century Chilean poets
21st-century Chilean male writers